Felix Manalo is a 2015 Filipino biographical film about the life of Felix Ysagun Manalo, the first Executive Minister of the Iglesia ni Cristo (INC), and the church he preached. Manalo is regarded by the members of the Iglesia ni Cristo as the last messenger of God and the restorer of the true Church of Christ, whom the INC gives the title Sugò. The story and screenplay were written by INC evangelism head Bienvenido Santiago. The film was directed by Joel Lamangan. All content of the film was screened and approved by the INC.

Synopsis
Felix Manalo (portrayed by Trillo) studies, joins, doubts, and eventually leaves both Catholicism and Protestantism before starting a church he believes to be a restoration of the Biblical church founded by Jesus.

Cast

Main cast

Dennis Trillo as Felix Y. Manalo

Supporting cast (in alphabetical order)

 AJ Muhlach as young Erdy Manalo
 Allan Paule as INC Member / Kapatid
 Alex Medina as Avelina's Husband
 Alfred Vargas as Prudencio Vásquez
 Alice Dixson as Lilia
 Alvin Fortuna as Doro
 Andrea del Rosario as Salvador's Wife
 Anja Aguilar as young Avelina Manalo
 Anita Hain as Mrs. Wolfe
 Antonio Aquitania as Atanacio "Tana" Morte
 Arci Muñoz as Tomasa Sereneo-Manalo
 Arkin del Rosario as young Salvador
Bela Padilla as Honorata "Ata" de Guzmán-Manalo
 Bembol Roco as Quintín Rivera
 Biboy Ramirez as Elias
 Bobby Andrews as Apolinario "Inar" Ramos
 Boy 2 Quizon as Maximiano "Mianong" Diosenito
 Brian Arda as Pastor
 Carl Acosta as young Felix Manalo
 Carla Humphries / Hannah Joy Magdales as young Pilar Manalo-Danao
 Caprice Cayetano as Lilia's Daughter
 China Cojuangco as Glicerio's Wife
 Chris Perris as Finster
 Christian Vasquez as Avelina's Husband
 Christopher Roxas as Sandoval
 Crispin Pineda as Kutsero 1
 Dale Baldillo as Eduardo "Eddie Boy" V. Manalo
 Dexter Doria as Tiya Isabel
 Dennis Coronel as Turla
 Dennis Pascual as Simbilio
 Eddie Gutierrez as Pastor Victoriano Mariano
 Edison Piloton as young Dominador
 Ejay Falcon as Serapio Dionisio
 Elizabeth Oropesa as Cianang
 Ermie Concepcion as Kumadrona
 Felix Roco as Bangkero
 Gabby Concepcion as Eraño "Ka Erdy" G. Manalo
 Gilleth Sandico as Babae 1
 Gladys Reyes as Avelina Manalo-Makapugay
 Glydel Mercado as Dominador's Wife
 Heart Evangelista as Cristina "Ka Tenny" Villanueva-Manalo
 Jaclyn Jose as Tiya Victorina
 Jacky Woo as Rev. Nakada
 Jaime Fabregas as Fr. Mariano de Borja
 Jaime Pebanco as Justino Casanova
 Jason Lacson as Grandchild
 Jay Manalo as INC Member / Kapatid
 Jess Evardone as Juanario
 Johan Santos as Pilar's Husband
 Joel Torre as Teofilo "Ka Pilo" Ramos
 Joem Bascon as Lucio Silvestre
 Jon Lucas / Ronnie Liang as Bienvenido "Bien" G. Manalo
 Joshua Clemente as Modesto
 Kevin Kier Remo as Bully Kid 1
 Kristel Fulgar as Grandchild
 Kuya Manzano as Prayle
 Lander Vera Perez as Rev. Nicolas Zamora
 Lloyd Samartino as Atty. Juan Natividad
 Lorna Tolentino as Doctor
 Marco Brillo as Bully Kid 2
 Mark Anthony Robrigado as Andres Tucker
 Martin Escudero as Jun Santos
 Martin Venegas as Bully Kid 3
 Menggie Cobarrubias as Teodoro Briones
 Mike Magat as Federico
 Mon Confiado as Leoncio Javier
 Mylene Dizon as Bonifacia "Facia" Manalo
 Neil Ryan Sese as Tomas dela Cruz
 Noel Colet as Salvador
 Paul Holme as Rev. Leslie Wolfe
 Phillip Salvador as Seventh Day Adventist Pastor
 Phoemela Barranda as Benjamin's Wife
 Ping Medina as War Victim
 Ramon Christopher Gutierrez as Maestro Cario
 Raymond Bagatsing as Carling
 Raymond Lauchengco as Dominador
 Regine Angeles as Asi
 Rey "PJ" Abellana as Pilar's Husband
 Ricardo Cepeda as Rosendo de Guzmán
 Richard Cunanan as Bruce Kershner
 Richard R. Felkey as Rev. J.B. Daugherty
 Richard Manabat as Methodist Pastor
 Richard Quan as Teofelo Ora
 Richard Yap as Glicerio Santos
 Ronnie Golpeo as INC Member / Kapatid
 Roxanne Barcelo as Praxedes Ysagun
 Ruby Ruiz as Marcelina
 Ruru Madrid as Eusebio Sunga
 Ryan Eigenmann as Methodist Pastor
 Sheryl Cruz as Sanang
 Simon Ibarra as Mariano
 Snooky Serna as Pilar Manalo-Danao
 TJ Trinidad as Pastor Emiliano Quijano
 Tonton Gutierrez as Benjamin Santiago
 Tony Mabesa as Pastor Guillermo Zarco
 Wendell Ramos as Juanario Ponce
 William Lorenzo as Ministro
 Wreijh Casimiro as young Bienvenido "Bien" Manalo
 Yul Servo as Clemente "Mente" Mozo

Production
Joel Lamangan served as the overall director of the film with Armando Reyes as the assistant director, and Glicerio Santos III as the creative producer. The production design was done by Edgar Martin Littaua, Joel Marcelo Bilbao and Daniel Red. Other members of the production team were Bienvenido Santiago (story and screenplay), Rody Lacap (director of photography), Albert Michael Idioma (sound supervisor), Von de Guzman (musical director), John Wong (film editor), and Juvan Bermil (makeup and hair design). The script was written by the head of evangelism of the INC, and the church approved of all content in the film.

About one hundred actors were included in the cast, while 8,000 people were hired as extras. Scenes were shot in Metro Manila, Laguna, Subic, and Bataan. This includes the INC Chapel F. Manalo (formerly Riverside) in San Juan, and the chapel in San Francisco del Monte, Quezon City, which was used in the funeral. Laguna de Bay stood in for the Pasig River in the baptism scenes.  The whole film was about 6 hours or 360 minutes in length, but a shorter version was used for its theatrical release.

Casting
Initially, Richard Gomez, Albert Martinez and Ramon "Bong" Revilla Jr. were tapped to play Felix Manalo, Eraño Manalo and Eduardo Manalo, respectively. However, Gomez and Revilla would later drop out of the project. Bong Revilla, who is also an incumbent Senator at that time, withdrew after he got implicated in the PDAF scam reasoning that it would shameful to portray a religious leader when he is riddled with political controversy.

Martinez would then be cast in the role of Felix Manalo, with Dennis Trillo playing a younger Felix Manalo. Martinez would also exit the project following the death of his wife, Liezl Martinez. Trillo would go on to play the old and the young Felix Manalo.

Soundtrack
The theme song and music video of the film entitled "Ang Sugo ng Diyos sa mga Huling Araw" was released on  October 4, 2015, at the Philippine Arena. The song was performed by Sarah Geronimo, composed by Joan and Ryan Solitario, and arranged by Louie Ocampo.

Release
On October 4, 2015, its premiere broke three Guinness world records for the largest audience in a film premiere, the largest audience in a film screening and the largest paying audience for a film premiere, with 43,624 attendees. VIVA Films set up a five-story, 22 by 40 meters high definition screen for the premiere at the Philippine Arena.

The film's cinematic release is 175 minutes in length while the 6-hour version will be included in the DVD release.

Felix Manalo was released in Philippine cinemas on October 7, 2015.

Reception

Evaluation
The Cinema Evaluation Board of the Philippines, the governing council for Filipino films, gave the film an "A". The film was graded based on its direction, screenplay, cinematography, editing, production design, music scoring, sound, and acting performances.

Critical reception
Reviewers have noted the makeup team's work on Trillo, which during the course of the film ages him from a young man through to age 76, and the nearly three-hour running time. The PhilStar commended the film's recreation of multiple historical time periods. The Manila Bulletin states the film "makes no qualms in its aim to preach" and that a lot of money was spent on the film because it will be "screened in several INC gatherings for many years to come."

Philbert Ortiz Dy of ClickTheCity was also critical, giving it 2 out of 5 stars and wrote, "It is slow, ponderous, and focuses on things that aren’t very interesting at all." While Michael Alegre of the Philippine Online Chronicles did not give a rating, he said in his review that it suffers from "a lack of focus, excessive content, an uneven pace, some jerky editing, and a noticeable partiality towards Felix Manalo".

Fred Hawson of ABS-CBN gave the film 7 out of 10 stars, praising the film's production, cinematography, and acting (particularly of Trillo), and noted the film's educational value "to know our INC brothers better."

Awards

References

External links 
 

Philippine religious epic films
Philippine historical films
Philippine biographical films
2015 films
2010s Tagalog-language films
Viva Films films
Iglesia ni Cristo
2010s war films
2010s biographical films
Films directed by Joel Lamangan